Red Bull Racing may refer to:

Red Bull Racing (RBR), one of two Formula One teams owned by Austrian beverage company Red Bull, this one based in Milton Keynes, England.
Red Bull Racing Team (RBRT), a defunct NASCAR Cup team owned by Red Bull based in Mooresville, North Carolina
Triple Eight Race Engineering, a Australian Supercar team, competing as the Red Bull Holden Racing Team
Ten Kate Racing, a Superbike World Championship racing team that races under the name Red Bull Honda World Superbike Team. 
A.Mattheis Motorsport, a Stock Car Brasil team owned by Andreas Mattheis that formerly competed as Red Bull Racing Brasil based in Rio de Janeiro, Brazil.
Alinghi Red Bull Racing, a yacht racing team organized to compete in the 2023 37th America's Cup.
AF Corse, a Deutsche Tourenwagen Masters team, competing as Red Bull AlphaTauri AF Corse

See also

 Red Bull Junior Team, Red Bull's driver development program
 Scuderia AlphaTauri (Team Alpha Bull), formerly Scuderia Toro Rosso Italian for Team Red Bull, an F1 racing team
 Red Bull Drifting World Championship
 Red Bull Trolley Grand Prix
 Red Bull MotoGP Rookies Cup, a 125cc class run at selected rounds of MotoGP
 Red Bull Air Race World Series, an air racing world series
 Red Bull 400, the most extreme and steepest global 400 m uphill sprint (world series, founded by Red Bull in 2011)
 Red Bull (disambiguation)